Developmental psychobiology is an interdisciplinary field, encompassing developmental psychology, biological psychology, neuroscience and many other areas of biology. The field covers all phases of ontogeny, with particular emphasis on prenatal, perinatal and early childhood development. Conducting research into basic aspects of development, for example, the development of infant attachment, sleep, eating, thermoregulation, learning, attention and acquisition of language occupies most developmental psychobiologists. At the same time, they are actively engaged in research on applied problems such as sudden infant death syndrome, the development and care of the preterm infant, autism, and the effects of various prenatal insults (e.g., maternal stress, alcohol exposure) on the development of brain and behavior (see Michel & Moore, 1995).

Developmental psychobiologists employ and integrate both biological and psychological concepts and methods (cf. Michel & Moore, 1995) and have historically been highly concerned with the interrelation between ontogeny and phylogeny (or individual development and evolutionary processes; see, e.g., Blumberg, 2002, 2005; Gottlieb, 1991).

Developmental psychobiologists also tend to be systems thinkers, avoiding the reification of artificial dichotomies (e.g., "nature" vs. "nurture"). Many developmental psychobiologists thus take exception to both the favored methods and theoretical underpinnings of fields like evolutionary psychology (see, e.g., Lickliter & Honeycutt, 2003).

One of the goals of developmental psychobiology is to explain the physical development of the nervous system and how that affects the individual's development in the long term. As seen in a study performed by Molly J. Goodfellow and Derick H. Lindquist, rats exposed to ethanol during early postnatal development experience structural and functional impairments throughout the brain, including the hypothalamus. These developmental complications caused the ethanol-exposed rats to lose their long-term memory capabilities, but maintain a nearly equal short-term memory capacity to that of the control rats. For more information about how ethanol affects the postnatal development of rats, see (e.g., Molly J. Goodfellow and Derick H. Lindquist, 2014).

See also

 Behavioral neuroscience
 Pre- and perinatal psychology
 Childbirth
 Pregnancy

References
 Michel, G. F., & Moore, C. L. (1995). Developmental Psychobiology: An Interdisciplinary Science. Cambridge, MA: MIT Press 
 Blumberg, M.S. (2002). Body Heat: Temperature and Life On Earth. Harvard University Press 
 Blumberg, M.S. (2005). Basic Instinct: The Genesis of Behavior. Basic Books 
 Gottlieb, G. (1991). Individual Development and Evolution: The Genesis of Novel Behavior. Oxford University Press

External links
 The International Society for Developmental Psychobiology - An annual forum for the presentation and dissemination of new research and findings in developmental psychobiology.
 Developmental Psychobiology journal

Behavioral neuroscience
Developmental psychology